Eszter Jurek (born November 24, 1936 in Budapest) is a Hungarian former Olympic figure skater and current coach. She is a three-time (1954–56) Hungarian champion in singles. She also competed in pairs with Miklós Kucharovits.
After her competitive career, she became a coach alongside fellow skater and men's national champion András Száraz. One of her most notable former pupils was fellow Hungarian and 2004 European champion Júlia Sebestyén.

Results

References
 Sports-reference.com
 other info

Figure skaters at the 1952 Winter Olympics
Hungarian female single skaters
Olympic figure skaters of Hungary
1936 births
Living people
Figure skaters from Budapest